The  2016 PGA Championship was the 98th PGA Championship which took place from July 28–31 at Baltusrol Golf Club on the Lower Course in Springfield Township, New Jersey, west of New York City. This was the ninth major and second PGA Championship at Baltusrol, which last hosted in 2005. Jimmy Walker won his first major championship title with a score of 14 under par, one shot ahead of 2015 champion Jason Day.

This edition of the PGA Championship was moved up two weeks from its early-August spot to accommodate the 2016 Olympic tournament in Rio de Janeiro. The John Deere Classic was moved back two weeks from its mid-July spot before the Open Championship and is taking its place on the schedule for those not qualified for the Olympics.

Course layout

Lower Course

Lengths of the course for previous major championships:
, par 70 - 2005 PGA Championship
, par 70 - 1993 U.S. Open
, par 70 - 1980 U.S. Open
, par 70 - 1967 U.S. Open
, par 70 - 1954 U.S. Open
, par 72 - 1936 U.S. Open (Upper Course)
, par 74 - 1915 U.S. Open (Old Course)
, par      - 1903 U.S. Open (Old Course)The Old Course no longer exists, plowed under in 1918

Field
The following qualification criteria were used to select the field. Each player is listed according to the first category by which he qualified with additional categories in which he qualified shown in parentheses.

1. All former PGA Champions
Rich Beem, Keegan Bradley (9), John Daly, Jason Day (6,8,10), Jason Dufner (8,10), Pádraig Harrington, Martin Kaymer (2,6,9), Rory McIlroy (4,8,9), Shaun Micheel, Phil Mickelson (4,8,9), Vijay Singh, David Toms, Yang Yong-eun
Davis Love III (10) and Tiger Woods did not play due to injury.
The following former champions did not enter: Paul Azinger, Mark Brooks, Jack Burke Jr., Steve Elkington, Dow Finsterwald, Raymond Floyd, Doug Ford, Al Geiberger, Wayne Grady, David Graham, Hubert Green, Don January, John Mahaffey, Larry Nelson, Bobby Nichols, Jack Nicklaus, Gary Player, Nick Price, Jeff Sluman, Dave Stockton, Hal Sutton, Lee Trevino, Bob Tway, Lanny Wadkins

2. Winners of last five U.S. Opens
Dustin Johnson (6,8,10), Justin Rose (6,8,9), Webb Simpson (8,9), Jordan Spieth (3,6,8,9,10)

3. Winners of last five Masters Tournaments
Adam Scott (8,10), Bubba Watson (8,9,10), Danny Willett (8)

4. Winners of last five British Opens
Ernie Els, Zach Johnson (8,9), Henrik Stenson (8,9)

5. Current Senior PGA Champion
Rocco Mediate

6. 15 low scorers and ties in the 2015 PGA Championship
George Coetzee, Tony Finau (8,10), Branden Grace (8,10), Russell Henley, Brooks Koepka (8), Matt Kuchar (8,9), Anirban Lahiri, David Lingmerth (8), Brandt Snedeker (8,10), Brendan Steele (8), Robert Streb (8)

7. 20 low scorers in the 2016 PGA Professional Championship
Rich Berberian, Jr., Michael Block, Mark Brown, Matt Dobyns, Brian Gaffney, Ryan Helminen, Johan Kok, Rob Labritz, Brad Lardon, Mitch Lowe, David Muttitt, Brad Ott, Rod Perry, Ben Polland, Rick Schuller, Tommy Sharp, Josh Speight, Joe Summerhays, Omar Uresti, Wyatt Worthington II 
Although Karen Paolozzi placed in the top 20, she was not eligible for entry to the PGA Championship under the Whaley Rule. A playoff ensued for the final spot.

8. Top 70 leaders in official money standings from the 2015 WGC-Bridgestone Invitational to the 2016 Open Championship and Barbasol Championship
Aaron Baddeley (10), Daniel Berger (10), Jason Bohn, Paul Casey, Roberto Castro, Kevin Chappell, Jon Curran, Harris English, Rickie Fowler (9,10), Jim Furyk (9), Sergio García (9,10), Fabián Gómez (10), Emiliano Grillo (10), Bill Haas, James Hahn (10), Jim Herman (10), Charley Hoffman (10), J. B. Holmes, Billy Hurley III (10), Smylie Kaufman (10), Kim Si-woo, Chris Kirk, Kevin Kisner (10), Patton Kizzire, Colt Knost, Russell Knox (10), Danny Lee, Jamie Lovemark, Shane Lowry, Hideki Matsuyama (10), Graeme McDowell (9,10), William McGirt (10), Bryce Molder, Ryan Moore, Kevin Na, Louis Oosthuizen, Ryan Palmer, Scott Piercy, Patrick Reed (9), Kyle Reifers, Charl Schwartzel (10), Kevin Streelman, Brian Stuard (10), Daniel Summerhays, Vaughn Taylor (10), Justin Thomas (10), Jimmy Walker (9), Gary Woodland 
Charles Howell III did not play due to injury.

9. Members of the United States and European 2014 Ryder Cup teams (provided they are ranked in the top 100 in the Official World Golf Ranking on July 1, 2016)
Jamie Donaldson, Victor Dubuisson, Lee Westwood 
Hunter Mahan (162), Thomas Bjørn (294), and Stephen Gallacher (290) did not qualify.
Ian Poulter did not play due to a foot injury.

10. Winners of tournaments co-sponsored or approved by the PGA Tour since the 2015 PGA Championship
Greg Chalmers, Peter Malnati, Jhonattan Vegas

11. Vacancies are filled by the first available player from the list of alternates (those below 70th place in official money standings).
Zac Blair, Billy Horschel, Freddie Jacobson, Jason Kokrak, Steve Stricker, Cameron Tringale, Harold Varner III

12. The PGA of America reserves the right to invite additional players not included in the categories listed above
An Byeong-hun, Kiradech Aphibarnrat, Grégory Bourdy, Kristoffer Broberg, Rafa Cabrera-Bello, K. J. Choi, Darren Clarke, Nicolas Colsaerts, Luke Donald, Bradley Dredge, Ross Fisher, Matt Fitzpatrick, Marcus Fraser, Tyrrell Hatton, Scott Hend, Yuta Ikeda, Thongchai Jaidee, Andrew Johnston, Matt Jones, Rikard Karlberg, Kim Kyung-tae, Søren Kjeldsen, Lee Soo-min, Marc Leishman, Joost Luiten, Troy Merritt, Francesco Molinari, James Morrison, Alex Norén, Thorbjørn Olesen, Thomas Pieters, John Senden, Song Young-han, Brandon Stone, Andy Sullivan, Hideto Tanihara, Wang Jeung-hun, Bernd Wiesberger, Chris Wood

Alternates (from category 11)
 Jonas Blixt (82) – replaced Charles Howell III

Round summaries

First round
Thursday, July 28, 2016

Jimmy Walker led after the first round with a five-under-par 65, one clear of Ross Fisher, Martin Kaymer and Emiliano Grillo. Two-time PGA winner Rory McIlroy was nine shots off the lead after a four-over-par 74 and 2016 U.S. Open champion Dustin Johnson was further behind at seven-over-par 77.

Second round
Friday, July 29, 2016

Robert Streb shot a major record-tying 63 to move into a tie for first place with first round leader Jimmy Walker at 131 (−9). Jason Day, the defending champion, was tied for third place, two strokes behind at 133 (−7) while the 2016 Open Championship winner, Henrik Stenson, was in fifth place at 134 (−6). Danny Willett, the 2016 Masters Tournament champion, was well back at 141, while Dustin Johnson, the 2016 U.S. Open winner, missed the cut with a 149 (+9). The cut was at 142 (+2) and 86 players made the cut.

Third round
Saturday, July 30, 2016

Play was suspended at 2:14 pm EDT due to dangerous weather conditions. Only 37 players finished their third rounds, with the leaders yet to tee off. Kevin Kisner was the overnight leader at the clubhouse at 5 under par.	

*Had not yet started their third round.

Sunday, July 31, 2016

Play was resumed at 7am EDT on Sunday. Jimmy Walker went into the final round with a single shot lead over Jason Day, and two shots ahead of Brooks Koepka and Henrik Stenson.

Final round
Sunday, July 31, 2016

The third round pairings were kept for the final round, and the final pair of Jimmy Walker and Robert Streb teed off shortly after their scheduled time of 3:16 pm EDT. Walker made no bogeys (or worse) during the final round, with all pars on the front nine, then made two consecutive birdies, the first by holing out from the greenside bunker on the 10th hole. His third and final birdie came at 17 for a three-shot lead over defending champion Jason Day, who quickly responded with an eagle on the 72nd hole, narrowing the margin to one shot.	
Walker won wire-to-wire by making a  par putt on the final hole to win by a stroke. With Walker's win, it was the first time since 2011 that all four major golf championships were won by first-time winners.

Due to course conditions, the fourth round was played with preferred lies, allowing players to "lift, clean and place" their balls on the fairways. This is believed to be the first time the rule was invoked in a major championship.

Final leaderboard

Note: Top 15 and ties qualify for the 2017 PGA Championship; top 4 and ties qualify for the 2017 Masters Tournament

Scorecard
Final round

Cumulative tournament scores, relative to par

References

External links

Coverage on the European Tour's official site

PGA Championship
Golf in New Jersey
Sports competitions in New Jersey
PGA Championship
PGA Championship
PGA Championship
PGA Championship